Alabang Girls is a Philippine sitcom produced by Viva Television and co-produced and aired by ABC from 1992 to 1994. This is a spin-off of the movie of the same name which was produced by Viva Films.

Cast
 Donita Rose
 Ruby Rodriguez
 Donna Cruz
 Lea Orosa
 Joy Ortega
 Jessa Zaragoza 
 Ana Roces (in movie)
 Pinky Amador (in movie)
 Maybelyn Dela Cruz (in movie)
 Rosanna Roces (in movie)
 Anjo Yllana
 Janno Gibbs
 Andrew E.
 Herbert Bautista
 Joji Isla
 Jet Alcantara

References

1992 Philippine television series debuts
1994 Philippine television series endings
Philippine television sitcoms
TV5 (Philippine TV network) original programming
Television series by Viva Television
Filipino-language television shows